Phengodes laticollis is a species of glowworm beetle in the family Phengodidae. It is found in North America.

Subspecies
These two subspecies belong to the species Phengodes laticollis:
 Phengodes laticollis laticollis LeConte, 1881
 Phengodes laticollis meridiana Wittmer, 1976

References

Further reading

 
 

Phengodidae
Bioluminescent insects
Articles created by Qbugbot
Beetles described in 1881